A coal-fired power station or coal power plant is a thermal power station which burns coal to generate electricity. Worldwide there are over 2,400 coal-fired power stations, totaling over 2,000 gigawatts capacity. They generate about a third of the world's electricity, but cause many illnesses and the most early deaths, mainly from air pollution.

A coal-fired power station is a type of fossil fuel power station. The coal is usually pulverized and then burned in a pulverized coal-fired boiler. The furnace heat converts boiler water to steam, which is then used to spin turbines that turn generators. Thus chemical energy stored in coal is converted successively into thermal energy, mechanical energy and, finally, electrical energy.

Coal-fired power stations emit over 10 Gt of carbon dioxide each year, about one fifth of world greenhouse gas emissions, so are the single largest cause of climate change. More than half of all the coal-fired electricity in the world is generated in China. In 2020 the total number of plants started falling as they are being retired in Europe and America although still being built in Asia, almost all in China. Some remain profitable because costs to other people due to the health and environmental impact of the coal industry are not priced into the cost of generation, but there is the risk newer plants may become stranded assets. The UN Secretary General has said that OECD countries should stop generating electricity from coal by 2030, and the rest of the world by 2040. Vietnam is among the few coal-depedent fast developing countries that fully pledged to phase out unbated coal power by the 2040s or as soon as possible thereafter.

History 

The first coal-fired power stations were built in the late 19th century and used reciprocating engines to generate direct current. Steam turbines allowed much larger plants to be built in the early 20th century and alternating current was used to serve wider areas.

Transport and delivery of coal 

Coal is delivered by highway truck, rail, barge, collier ship or coal slurry pipeline. Generating stations are sometimes built next to a mine; especially one mining coal, such as lignite, which is not valuable enough to transport long-distance; so may receive coal by conveyor belt or massive diesel-electric-drive trucks. A large coal train called a "unit train" may be 2 km long, containing 130-140 cars with around 100 tonnes of coal in each one, for a total load of over 10000 tonnes. A large plant under full load requires at least one coal delivery this size every day. Plants may get as many as three to five trains a day, especially in "peak season" during the hottest summer or coldest winter months (depending on local climate) when power consumption is high.

Modern unloaders use rotary dump devices, which eliminate problems with coal freezing in bottom dump cars. The unloader includes a train positioner arm that pulls the entire train to position each car over a coal hopper. The dumper clamps an individual car against a platform that swivels the car upside down to dump the coal. Swiveling couplers enable the entire operation to occur while the cars are still coupled together. Unloading a unit train takes about three hours.

Shorter trains may use railcars with an "air-dump", which relies on air pressure from the engine plus a "hot shoe" on each car. This "hot shoe" when it comes into contact with a "hot rail" at the unloading trestle, shoots an electric charge through the air dump apparatus and causes the doors on the bottom of the car to open, dumping the coal through the opening in the trestle. Unloading one of these trains takes anywhere from an hour to an hour and a half. Older unloaders may still use manually operated bottom-dump rail cars and a "shaker" attached to dump the coal.

A collier (cargo ship carrying coal) may hold  of coal and takes several days to unload. Some colliers carry their own conveying equipment to unload their own bunkers; others depend on equipment at the plant. For transporting coal in calmer waters, such as rivers and lakes, flat-bottomed barges are often used. Barges are usually unpowered and must be moved by tugboats or towboats.

For start up or auxiliary purposes, the plant may use fuel oil as well. Fuel oil can be delivered to plants by pipeline, tanker, tank car or truck. The heavier no. 5 "bunker" and no. 6 fuels are typically steam-heated before pumping in cold climates.

Operation 

As a type of thermal power station, a coal-fired power station converts chemical energy stored in coal successively into thermal energy, mechanical energy and, finally, electrical energy. The coal is usually pulverized and then burned in a pulverized coal-fired boiler. The heat from the burning pulverized coal converts boiler water to steam, which is then used to spin turbines that turn generators. Compared to a thermal power station burning other fuel types, coal specific fuel processing and ash disposal is required.

For units over about 200 MW capacity, redundancy of key components is provided by installing duplicates of the forced and induced draft fans, air preheaters, and fly ash collectors. On some units of about 60 MW, two boilers per unit may instead be provided. The hundred largest coal power stations range in size from 3,000MW to 6,700MW.

Fuel processing 
Coal is prepared for use by crushing the rough coal to pieces less than 5 cm in size. The coal is then transported from the storage yard to in-plant storage silos by conveyor belts at rates up to 4,000 tonnes per hour.

In plants that burn pulverized coal, silos feed coal to pulverizers (coal mills) that take the larger 5 cm pieces, grind them to the consistency of talcum powder, sort them, and mix them with primary combustion air, which transports the coal to the boiler furnace and preheats the coal in order to drive off excess moisture content. A 500 MWe plant may have six such pulverizers, five of which can supply coal to the furnace at 250 tonnes per hour under full load.

In plants that do not burn pulverized coal, the larger 5 cm pieces may be directly fed into the silos which then feed either mechanical distributors that drop the coal on a traveling grate or the cyclone burners, a specific kind of combustor that can efficiently burn larger pieces of fuel.

Boiler operation 

Plants designed for lignite (brown coal) are used in locations as varied as Germany, Victoria, Australia, and North Dakota. Lignite is a much younger form of coal than black coal. It has a lower energy density than black coal and requires a much larger furnace for equivalent heat output. Such coals may contain up to 70% water and ash, yielding lower furnace temperatures and requiring larger induced-draft fans. The firing systems also differ from black coal and typically draw hot gas from the furnace-exit level and mix it with the incoming coal in fan-type mills that inject the pulverized coal and hot gas mixture into the boiler.

Ash disposal 
The ash is often stored in ash ponds. Although the use of ash ponds in combination with air pollution controls (such as wet scrubbers) decreases the amount of airborne pollutants, the structures pose serious health risks for the surrounding environment. Power utility companies have often built the ponds without liners, especially in the United States, and therefore chemicals in the ash can leach into groundwater and surface waters.

Since the 1990s, power utilities in the U.S. have designed many of their new plants with dry ash handling systems. The dry ash is disposed in landfills, which typically include liners and groundwater monitoring systems. Dry ash may also be recycled into products such as concrete, structural fills for road construction and grout.

Fly ash collection 

Fly ash is captured and removed from the flue gas by electrostatic precipitators or fabric bag filters (or sometimes both) located at the outlet of the furnace and before the induced draft fan. The fly ash is periodically removed from the collection hoppers below the precipitators or bag filters. Generally, the fly ash is pneumatically transported to storage silos and stored on site in ash ponds, or transported by trucks or railroad cars to landfills,

Bottom ash collection and disposal 

At the bottom of the furnace, there is a hopper for collection of bottom ash.  This hopper is kept filled with water to quench the ash and clinkers falling down from the furnace.  Arrangements are included to crush the clinkers and convey the crushed clinkers and bottom ash to on-site ash ponds, or off-site to landfills.  Ash extractors are used to discharge ash from municipal solid waste–fired boilers.

Flexibility 

A well-designed energy policy, energy law and electricity market are critical for flexibility. Although technically the flexibility of some coal-fired power stations could be improved they are less able to provide dispatchable generation than most gas-fired power plants. The most important flexibility is low minimum load, however some flexibility improvements may be more expensive than renewable energy with batteries.

Coal power generation 

 two-thirds of coal burned is to generate electricity. In 2020 coal was the largest source of electricity at 34%. Over half coal generation in 2020 was in China. About 60% of electricity in China, India and Indonesia is from coal.

In 2020 worldwide 2059 GW of coal power was operational, 50 GW was commissioned, and 25 GW started construction (most of these three in China); and 38 GW retired (mostly USA and EU).

Efficiency 
There are 4 main types of coal-fired power station in increasing order of efficiency are: subcritical, supercritical, ultra-supercritical and cogeneration (also called combined heat and power or CHP). Subcritical is the least efficient type, however recent innovations have allowed retrofits to older subcritical plants to meet or even exceed efficiency of supercritical plants.

Integrated gasification combined cycle design 

Integrated gasification combined cycle (IGCC) is a coal power generation technology that uses a high pressure gasifier to turn coal (or other carbon based fuels) into pressurized gas—synthesis gas (syngas).  Converting the coal to gas enables the use of a combined cycle generator, typically achieving high efficiency. The IGCC process can also enable removal of some pollutants from the syngas prior to the power generation cycle. However, the technology is costly compared with conventional coal-fired power stations.

Carbon dioxide emissions 

As coal is mainly carbon, coal-fired power stations have a high carbon intensity. On average, coal power stations emit far more greenhouse gas per unit electricity generated compared with other energy sources (see also life-cycle greenhouse-gas emissions of energy sources). In 2018 coal burnt to generate electricity emitted over 10 Gt  of the 34 Gt total from fuel combustion (the overall total greenhouse gas emissions for 2018 was 55 Gt e).

Mitigation

Phase out 

From 2015 to 2020, although coal generation hardly fell in absolute terms, some of its market share was taken by wind and solar. In 2020 only China increased coal power generation, and globally it fell by 4%. The UN Secretary General has said that OECD countries should stop generating electricity from coal by 2030 and the rest of the world by 2040, otherwise limiting global warming to 1.5 °C, a target of the Paris Agreement, would be extremely difficult. Phasing out in Asia can be a financial challenge as plants there are relatively young: in China the co-benefits of closing a plant vary greatly depending on its location.

Ammonia co-firing 
Ammonia has a high hydrogen density and is easy to handle. It can be used as storing carbon-free fuel in gas turbine power generation and help significantly reduce CO₂ emissions as a fuel.
In Japan, the first major four-year test project was started in June 2021 to develop technology to enable co-firing a significant amount of ammonia at a large-scale commercial coal-fired plant. However low-carbon hydrogen and ammonia is in demand for sustainable shipping, which unlike electricity generation, has few other clean options.

Conversion 
Some power stations are being converted to burn gas, biomass or waste, and conversion to thermal storage will be trialled in 2023.

Carbon capture 
Retrofitting some existing coal-fired power stations with carbon capture and storage was being considered in China in 2020, but this is very expensive, reduces the energy output and for some plants is not technically feasible.

Pollution 

In some countries pollution is somewhat controlled by best available techniques, for example those in the EU through its Industrial Emissions Directive. In the United States, coal-fired plants are governed at the national level by several air pollution regulations, including the Mercury and Air Toxics Standards (MATS) regulation, by effluent guidelines for water pollution, and by solid waste regulations under the Resource Conservation and Recovery Act (RCRA).

Coal-fired power stations continue to pollute in lightly regulated countries; such as the Western Balkans, India, Russia and South Africa; causing over a hundred thousand early deaths each year.

Local air pollution 
Damage to health from particulates, sulphur dioxide and nitrogen oxide occurs mainly in Asia and is often due to burning low quality coal, such as lignite, in plants lacking modern flue gas treatment. Early deaths due to air pollution have been estimated at 200 per GW-year, however they may be higher around power plants where scrubbers are not used or lower if they are far from cities.

Water pollution 
Pollutants such as heavy metals leaching into ground water from unlined coal ash storage ponds or landfills pollute water, possibly for decades or centuries. Pollutant discharges from ash ponds to rivers (or other surface water bodies) typically include arsenic, lead, mercury, selenium, chromium, and cadmium.

Mercury emissions from coal-fired power plants can fall back onto the land and water in rain, and then be converted into methylmercury by bacteria. Through biomagnification, this mercury can then reach dangerously high levels in fish. More than half of atmospheric mercury comes from coal-fired power plants.

Coal-fired power plants also emit sulfur dioxide and nitrogen. These emissions lead to acid rain, which can restructure food webs and lead to the collapse of fish and invertebrate populations.

Mitigation of local pollution 

 local pollution in China, which has by far the most coal-fired power stations, is forecast to be reduced further in the 2020s and 2030s, especially if small and low efficiency plants are retired early.

Economics

Subsidies 
Coal power plants tend to serve as base load technology, as they have high availability factors, and are relatively difficult and expensive to ramp up and down. As such, they perform poorly in real-time energy markets, where they are unable to respond to changes in the locational marginal price. In the United States, this has been especially true in light of the advent of cheap natural gas, which can serve as a fuel in dispatchable power plants that substitute the role of baseload on the grid.

In 2020 the coal industry was subsidized $US18 billion.

Finance 

The largest backers are Chinese banks under the Belt and Road Initiative (BRI).

Capacity factors 
In India capacity factors are below 60%. In 2020 coal-fired power stations in the United States had an overall capacity factor of 40%; that is, they operated at a little less than half of their cumulative nameplate capacity.

Stranded assets 
If global warming is limited to well below 2 °C as specified in the Paris Agreement, coal plant stranded assets of over US$500 billion are forecast by 2050, mostly in China. In 2020 think tank Carbon Tracker estimated that 39% of coal-fired plants were already more expensive than new renewables and storage and that 73% would be by 2025.  about half of China's coal power companies are losing money and old and small power plants "have no hope of making profits".  India is keeping potential stranded assets operating by subsidizing them.

Politics 

In May 2021, the G7 committed to end support for coal-fired power stations within the year.

The energy policy of China regarding coal and coal in China are the most important factors regarding the future of coal-fired power stations, because the country has so many. According to one analysis local officials overinvested in coal-fired power in the mid-2010s because central government guaranteed operating hours and set a high wholesale electricity price.

In democracies coal power investment follows an environmental Kuznets curve. The energy policy of India about coal is an issue in the politics of India.

Protests 
Protests have often been at mining sites and at sites of proposed new plants.

See also 
 Powering Past Coal Alliance
 Global Energy Monitor

References

External links 
 Coal fired power plant Energy Education by the University of Calgary
 How a coal plant works video by the Tennessee Valley Authority
 How a coal plant works video by Ontario Power Generation
 Electricity from coal by the World Coal Association
 World's coal power plants mapped by Carbon Brief
 End Coal by various environmental, social justice and health advocates
 Coal-fired power by the International Energy Agency
 Economics of coal by Carbon Tracker
 Centre for Research on Energy and Clean Air

Coal-fired power stations
Greenhouse gas emissions